Restless days (she screams out loud) was a single by UK male vocal and instrumental band And Why Not?.  It entered the UK Singles Chart on 14 October 1989. It reached a peak position of number 38, and remained in the chart for 7 weeks.

Wayne Gidden sang and played guitar, Hylton Hayles played the bass, and Michael Steer was the drummer.

References 

1980 singles
1980 songs
Island Records singles